The 2011 FIFA Beach Soccer World Cup CONMEBOL qualifier, also later and commonly known as the 2011 South American Beach Soccer Championship, was the fourth Beach Soccer World Cup qualification championship for South America, held from July 31– August 7 on Copacabana beach in Rio de Janeiro, Brazil.  The tournament was originally scheduled to take place from 7 – 14 May 2011.

The qualifiers were not coordinated by CONMEBOL at the time. The event was organised by Beach Soccer Worldwide (BSWW), under the FIFA Beach Soccer World Cup Qualifier title. CONMEBOL began recognising the tournaments in 2013, under the title South American Beach Soccer Championship, also acknowledging the 2006–11 events as historic editions of the championship. CONMEBOL eventually began organising the qualifiers in 2017, under a new title.

Participating teams
A tournament-record nine teams, an increase of one team from the previous CONMEBOL qualifier, have confirmed their participation in the competition.

Group stage
The draw to decide the groups was conducted on June 29, 2011.

All match times were of local time in Rio de Janeiro, being Brasilia Time, (UTC-03:00).

Group A

Group B

Knockout stage

Semi finals

Third place play off

Final

Winners

Awards

Teams Qualifying

Final Placement

References

2011
Qualification Conmebol
Beach Soccer Championship
2011
2011 in beach soccer